Jaret is a given name. Notable people with the name include:

Jaret Anderson-Dolan (born 1999), Canadian ice hockey player
Jaret Gibbons (born 1980), American politician
Jaret Holmes (born 1976), American football player
Jaret Patterson (born 1999), American football player
Jaret Wright (born 1975), American baseball player

See also 
 Jarett
 Jarret (disambiguation)
 Jarrett (disambiguation)